The 1931 Providence Steam Roller season was their seventh and final in the league. The team failed to improve on their previous season's output of 6–4–1, winning only four games. They finished sixth in the league.

Schedule

Standings

References

Providence Steam Roller seasons
Providence Steam Roller